Primary Road No. 4 was a state highway in western Iowa.  It is related to the current highways:

U.S. Highway 275 between the Missouri state line and Hillsdale
U.S. Highway 34 between Hillsdale and Hastings
U.S. Highway 59 between Hastings and Denison
Iowa Highway 39 between Dension and Odebolt
Iowa Highway 175 between Odebolt and near Wall Lake
Iowa Highway 471 between near Wall Lake to Early
U.S. Highway 71 between Early and the Minnesota state line

P004